This article documents the 2009–10 season of Gloucestershire football club Cheltenham Town F.C.

League table

Results

League Two

FA Cup

League Cup

Football League Trophy

Players

First-team squad
Includes all players who were awarded squad numbers during the season.

Left club during season

References

Cheltenham Town
Cheltenham Town F.C. seasons
English football clubs 2009–10 season